Topham may refer to:

 Topham, South Yorkshire, England

People
 Topham Beauclerk (1739–1780), British entertainer
 Arthur Topham (1869–1931), England footballer
 Brandon Topham (born 1971), South African politician
 Edward Topham (1751–1820), English journalist, playwright, poet, and landowner from Wold Newton, Yorkshire
 Francis William Topham (1809–1877), English watercolorist and engraver
 Paula Topham (born 1944), actress in the television series Angel Pavement
 Robert Topham (footballer) (1867–1931), England footballer
 Sara Topham (born 1976), Canadian actress
 Thomas Topham (c. 1702–1749), English strongman
 Tony Topham (1929–2004), British academic and writer
 Top Topham (born 1947), original lead guitarist in The Yardbirds

Others
Topham Chase, a National Hunt handicap chase in England 
Topham Guerin, a public relations company in New Zealand
 Sir Topham Hatt, the Fat Controller from The Railway Series and Thomas and Friends

See also
 Topsham (disambiguation)